Canción al 9 de Octubre (Song of October Ninth) is a poem written by José Joaquín de Olmedo in 1821, to commemorate the 1820 Independence of Guayaquil. A mayoral decree on July 8, 1898 officially  declared it as "Himno al 9 de Octubre", and this Anthem in honor of Guayaquil's Independence became widely known as Guayaquil's Anthem.

Cancion al Nueve de Octubre 

Lyrics:José Joaquín de Olmedo, 1821.
Music:Ana Villamil Ycaza, 1895.

 CoroSaludemos gozososEn armoniosos cánticosEsta aurora gloriosaQue anuncia libertadLibertad, libertad!I¿Veis esa luz amableque raya en el oriente,cada vez más lucienteen gracia celestial?Esa es la aurora plácida¡que anuncia libertad! Esa es la aurora plácida ¡que anuncia libertad!  IINosotros guardaremoscon ardor indecibletu fuego inextinguible¡oh santa Libertad!Como vestales vírgenesque sirven a tu altar,como vestales vírgenesque sirven a tu altarIIIHaz que en el suelo que amasflorezcan en todas partes el culto de las artesy el honor nacional.Y da con mano pródigalos bienes de la paz,y da con mano pródiga los bienes de la paz.

South American anthems
National symbols of Ecuador
Ecuadorian songs
Ecuadorian poetry